Acosta is the twelfth canton in the province of San José in Costa Rica. The head city of the canton is San Ignacio.

History 
Acosta was created on 27 October 1910 by decree 24.

Geography 
Acosta has an area of  km² and a mean elevation of  metres.

The mountainous canton begins in the Cerros de Escazú on the far western edge of the San José Metropolitan Area. It continues west and south between the Negro River on the north and the Jorco River on the east to encompass a large portion of the Coastal Mountain Range, ending at the border of Puntarenas Province near the Pacific coast in Parrita Canton.

Districts 
The canton of Acosta is subdivided into the following districts:
 San Ignacio
 Guaitil
 Palmichal
 Cangrejal
 Sabanillas

Demographics 

For the 2011 census, Acosta had a population of  inhabitants.

Transportation

Road transportation 
The canton is covered by the following road routes:
 National Route 209
 National Route 301

References

External links
 "Acosta Google Satellite Map" Maplandia

Cantons of San José Province
Greater Metropolitan Area (Costa Rica)